is a Japanese record label, run by , that specializes in enka, kayōkyoku, and similar music. It is a division of commercial karaoke manufacturer XING Inc., itself a subsidiary of Brother Industries.

Offices of Teichiku Entertainment, Inc. 
Head office - Shiba Park Building, 2-4-1, Shiba koen, Minato-ku, Tokyo, Japan
Osaka office - Sankyu Building, 2-14, Azuchimachi Sanchome, Chūō-ku, Osaka, Japan

History 
February 11, 1934 - Teikoku Chikuonki Company (帝国蓄音機株式会社) was founded in Nara, Japan.
September 1951 - Contracted with Decca Records.
February 1952 - Started to sell Decca records.
February 11, 1953 - Teikoku Chikuonki was renamed Teichiku, Inc. (テイチク株式会社). In the same year, the company began using magnetic tape for recording.
1954 - Began selling LP records and EP records.
1969 - Termination of contract with Decca.
1999 - Tokyo head office moved from Aobadai, Meguroku to Jingumae, Shibuya and the company was renamed Teichiku Entertainment, Inc. (株式会社テイチクエンタテインメント)".
April 28, 2015 - JVC Kenwood Holdings sells their majority stake of Teichiku to commercial karaoke manufacturer XING Inc (subsidiary of Brother Industries).
August, 2017 - Tokyo head office moved from Jingumae, Shibuya to XING Inc. headquarters in Minato-ku.

See also 
 List of record labels
 JVCKenwood Victor Entertainment

External links 
  
 

Japanese record labels
IFPI members
Entertainment companies of Japan